David John Bradley (born 17 April 1942) is a British  actor. He is known for playing Argus Filch in the Harry Potter film series, Walder Frey in the HBO fantasy series Game of Thrones, Abraham Setrakian in the FX horror series The Strain, and for voicing Merlin in Guillermo del Toro’s animated Netflix series Tales of Arcadia (for which he won an Annie Award for Best Voice Actor in a Television Series). 

A character actor, Bradley's screen roles include parts in Our Friends in the North, the Three Flavours Cornetto trilogy and After Life. He has made several appearances as the First Doctor in Doctor Who, having portrayed the role's originator, William Hartnell, in the docudrama An Adventure in Space and Time. 

An alumnus of the Royal Shakespeare Company, Bradley is also an established stage actor, with a career that includes a Laurence Olivier Award for his role in a production of King Lear and appearing in the Harold Pinter play No Man's Land at the Duke of York's Theatre in the West End.

Early life
Bradley was born in York, where he attended the Catholic St George's Secondary Modern School, where he was a member of the choir. He first performed on stage in musical productions, as a member of a youth club and with the Rowntree Youth Theatre. Upon leaving school, he completed a five-year apprenticeship with the optical instruments maker Cooke, Troughton & Simms and remained with the firm until 1966, when he moved to London to train as an actor at the Royal Academy of Dramatic Art.

Career

Bradley joined the Royal Shakespeare Company and performed at Laurence Olivier's National Theatre Company in the early 1970s. He first appeared on television in 1971, as a police officer in the comedy Nearest and Dearest. He was awarded a Laurence Olivier Award in 1991 for his supporting role as the Fool in King Lear at the Royal National Theatre. He appeared in the Royal National Theatre's 1997 production of The Homecoming, as well as productions of The Caretaker at Sheffield Theatres and the Tricycle Theatre from 2006 to 2007. In 2005 he played the title role in Nicholas Hytner's production of Henry IV Parts One and Two at the Olivier Theatre, London.

Bradley played fictional Labour Member of Parliament Eddie Wells in the 1996 BBC Two serial Our Friends in the North. Also in 1996, he appeared as gangster Alf Black in Band of Gold. In 1998, he appeared in the BBC adaptation of Vanity Fair as the miserly Sir Pitt Crawley, and Our Mutual Friend as the villainous Rogue Riderhood. Other television appearances include the 2001 series The Way We Live Now, directed by David Yates, who would work with Bradley five years later on the Harry Potter films.

From 2002 to 2004, Bradley starred as Jake in the BBC comedy series Wild West. Bradley acted in the 2004 musical drama serial Blackpool on BBC One. He appeared in the 2005 BBC drama Mr. Harvey Lights a Candle, playing the role of a morose coach driver who takes an unruly party of pupils on a trip to Salisbury Cathedral, and the 2006 BBC drama Sweeney Todd. He had a small role in a 2005 episode of the series Taggart. In 2003, he played Tom in the Midsomer Murders episode "The Green Man". He appeared as the electrolarynx-using gangster Stemroach in the BBC comedy series Ideal and as Electric in the BBC's Thieves Like Us, as well as the BBC One series True Dare Kiss in 2007–08.

Bradley appeared in the 2002 film Nicholas Nickleby which was based on The Life and Adventures of Nicholas Nickleby by Charles Dickens, and had a small role in the 2007 comedy film Hot Fuzz as a farmer who illegally hoards weapons. He played Cohen the Barbarian in a Sky One adaptation of The Colour of Magic in 2008. That same year he appeared as Spooner in a production of Harold Pinter’s No Man's Land at the Gate Theatre, Dublin, which later transferred to London's West End.

In 2009, Bradley appeared in Ashes to Ashes, playing an animal rights activist, and in The Street, both on BBC. Bradley portrayed Will Somers, Henry VIII's court fool, in an episode of the Showtime series The Tudors in 2009. In 2010, he appeared in the film Another Year, which earned him a nomination for Best Supporting Actor from the London Film Critics Circle Awards. From 2011 to 2017, Bradley appeared as Lord Walder Frey in the HBO series Game of Thrones.

Bradley played Solomon, a ruthless buccaneer, in the 2012 Doctor Who episode "Dinosaurs on a Spaceship". He previously provided voice work for The Sarah Jane Adventures serial Death of the Doctor. It was announced in January 2013, that Bradley had been cast as actor William Hartnell in An Adventure in Space and Time, a BBC docudrama about the creation of Doctor Who in 1963. The special aired in November 2013, adding to the buildup to the 50th anniversary episode of Doctor Who later that month. In 2013, he also appeared in The World's End, a follow-up to Hot Fuzz in the Three Flavours Cornetto trilogy, this time portraying "Mad" Basil, an eccentric local man from the fictional English town Newton Haven.

From 2014, Bradley plays Professor Abraham Setrakian, a Holocaust survivor turned vampire hunter in Guillermo del Toro's TV series The Strain. In 2015, Bradley became a public supporter of Chapel Lane Theatre Company based in Stratford-Upon-Avon. In 2017, Bradley joined the cast of Guillermo del Toro’s animated Netflix series Trollhunters: Tales of Arcadia playing the role of Merlin. In 2021, he received an Annie Award for Best Voice Actor in a Television Role for his role in the final chapter of the trilogy, Wizards: Tales of Arcadia as the wizard Merlin.

In 2017, in the final episode of the tenth series of Doctor Who, "The Doctor Falls", Bradley returned to portray the First Doctor, having previously portrayed Hartnell, who originally played the character. He reprised the role in the 2017 Christmas special, "Twice Upon a Time", in an audio series for Big Finish Productions titled Doctor Who: The First Doctor Adventures alongside his An Adventure in Space and Time cast, and in the Immersive Theatre show Doctor Who: Time Fracture. This makes him the third actor to play the role in the television programme, after William Hartnell and Richard Hurndall since the premiere of Doctor Who in 1963, and at the age of 75, he is the also the oldest actor to play the role of the Doctor on television. 
He again played the First Doctor in the final episode of the 2022 specials, "The Power of the Doctor".

From 2019 to 2022, Bradley played Ray Johnson, the demented father of Tony (Ricky Gervais) in the Netflix series After Life. In 2021, it was announced that Bradley would be joining the cast of Allelujah, a film adaptation of Alan Bennet's play of the same name directed by Richard Eyre, which will star Jennifer Saunders, Bally Gill, Russell Tovey, Derek Jacobi, and Judi Dench. In 2022, it was announced that Bradley would voice Fowler in Chicken Run: Dawn of the Nugget.

Personal life
Bradley married his wife Rosanna in 1978. They have three children. His eldest son, George, is an architect, who has featured on the ITV series Love Your Home and Garden alongside Alan Titchmarsh. His daughter, Francesca, works in casting, having worked on Michael Bay's 6 Underground. He has said that it was his daughter who turned his attention to the Harry Potter film franchise and coached him for the role of Argus Filch.

Bradley is the president of Second Thoughts Drama Group, which performs in and around Stratford-upon-Avon. He has received honorary doctorates from the University of Warwick (17 July 2012) and York St John University (19 November 2015).

He is an avid fan of football clubs Aston Villa and York City.  On 22 November 2014, he took part in a video paying tribute to Aston Villa on their 140th birthday.

Filmography

Film

Television

Attractions

References

External links

 Podcast interview with David Bradley on his career Interview with David Bradley on the occasion of receiving his honorary degree from the University of Warwick

1942 births
Annie Award winners
Audiobook narrators
English male film actors
English male television actors
Living people
Male actors from York
Best Supporting Actor BAFTA Award (television) winners
Laurence Olivier Award winners
Clarence Derwent Award winners
20th-century English male actors
21st-century English male actors
English male voice actors
English male stage actors
Alumni of RADA
English male Shakespearean actors
Royal Shakespeare Company members